Gerardo C. Ablaza, Jr. is a Filipino business executive, president and chief executive officer of Manila Water Company, the water utility subsidiary of Ayala Corporation.

Ablaza was appointed president and CEO of Manila Water Company on June 30, 2010. As the leader of a public-private partnership, he is responsible for overseeing the financial and operational growth within Manila Water's service areas in the Metro Manila East Zone and in its expansion areas in the industrially advanced province of Laguna, Boracay, Clark Airbase, and the province of Cebu.

In Ayala Corporation, the oldest conglomerate in the Philippines, Ablaza is currently a senior managing director and a member of the Ayala Group Management Committee, a post he has held since 1998.

From 1998 to April 2009, Gerry was president and CEO of Globe Telecom, Inc. During this period, the company was fourth-ranked mobile services provider to then becoming the second-largest full-service telecom operator, with a subscriber base of 25 million in 2008. Before joining the Ayala Group, he was vice president and country business manager for the Philippines and Guam of Citibank N.A. for its global consumer banking business. Prior to this, he headed the Credit Payments Products Division of Citibank N.A. in Singapore.

In 2004, he was recognized by CNBC as the Asia Business Leader of the Year, making him the first Filipino CEO to win the award. In the same year, he was awarded by Telecom Asia as the Best Asian Telecom CEO. In 2013, he was recognized for his consistent leadership and innovation across the banking, investment, telecommunications and utility service industries through the Citi Distinguished Alumni Award for Leadership and Ingenuity. He is the first and only Filipino to be awarded with such an honor.

Education
Ablaza graduated summa cum laude from the De La Salle University in 1974 with a degree in liberal arts, majoring in mathematics (honors program). Gerry sits as a member of the board of trustees in various De La Salle schools in the country.

References

See also
 Philippine energy law

21st-century Filipino businesspeople
Living people
Ayala Corporation people
Year of birth missing (living people)
Filipino chief executives